Natasha Scott (née Van Eldik) (born 27 November 1990) is an Australian international lawn bowler.

World Championship 
She won the lawn bowls gold medal in the triples competition at the 2012 World Outdoor Bowls Championship in addition to the team event.

In 2016, she was part of the fours team with Rebecca Van Asch, Carla Krizanic and Kelsey Cottrell who won the gold medal at the 2016 World Outdoor Bowls Championship in Christchurch and a gold medal in the triples with Van Asch and Krizanic. A third gold medal was inevitable in the team event.

In 2020 she was selected for the 2020 World Outdoor Bowls Championship in Australia.

Commonwealth Games 
She was part of the Australian team for the 2018 Commonwealth Games on the Gold Coast in Queensland where she claimed two more gold medals in the Fours with Cottrell, Krizanic and Van Asch and the Triples with Krizanic and Van Asch.

In 2022, she competed in the women's triples and the Women's fours at the 2022 Commonwealth Games.

International 
Scott has won five medals at the Asia Pacific Bowls Championships, two of which were gold, the latest at the 2019 Asia Pacific Bowls Championships in the Gold Coast, Queensland. In 2018, she won the Hong Kong International Bowls Classic pairs title with Ellen Ryan.

National
In 2021, playing under the name Van Eldik she won the pairs (with Genevieve Delves) and triples (with Davis and Kate Matthews) at the delayed 2020 Australian National Bowls Championships. This was her third national title after previously winning the 2017 triples. She also has four Australian Open titles to her name (2015, 2016, 2019, 2021).

Personal life
On 7 January 2014 Van Eldik married fellow Raymond Terrace BC player Lennon Scott.

References

1990 births
Living people
Australian female bowls players
Bowls World Champions
Commonwealth Games gold medallists for Australia
Commonwealth Games medallists in lawn bowls
Bowls players at the 2018 Commonwealth Games
Bowls players at the 2022 Commonwealth Games
21st-century Australian women
Medallists at the 2018 Commonwealth Games